The Birth of a Baby is a 1938 American educational film about childbearing.  It was directed by famed Canadian producer of silent shorts Al Christie. The film stars Eleanore King, Richard Gordon, Ruth Matteson, and Josephine Dunn. The film's original negative was lost in the Fox vault fire of 1937.

Cast

Censorship
The film featured scenes of actual childbirth and this caused issues for the Hays Office. The filmmakers tried to get around the need for a Seal of Approval from the Hays Office by appealing directly to local and state censorship boards for approval to show the film in mainstream theaters. The film was banned in New York State in 1939 by a court ruling that scenes of childbirth were too indecent for public entertainment.

References

External links

1938 films
1930s educational films
1938 drama films
American drama films
American black-and-white films
1938 documentary films
1930s American films
American educational films